The 1894 North-West Territories general election was held on 31 October 1894. This was the third general election in the history of the North-West Territories, Canada. It was held to elect 29 members of the Legislative Assembly of the North-West Territories, the writs were dropped on 3 October 1894. Frederick Haultain continued to lead the government.

This was the first general election a secret ballot was held, with voters marking an X on a blank piece of paper in the colour that corresponds to their candidate.

Election results
The turnout cannot be established, as no voters lists were in use. 

Members were elected on non-partisan basis but decisions were decided by majority vote in the chamber.

Results by riding 
Members elected to the 3rd North-West Legislative Assembly. 
For complete electoral history, see individual districts

Further reading

External links
Personnel of the Northwest Territories Assembly 1888–1905

Elections in the Northwest Territories
1894 elections in Canada
1894 in the Northwest Territories
October 1894 events